is a 2001 Japanese film directed by Seijun Suzuki and starring Makiko Esumi.

Storyline

The film's main character, Miyuki Minazuki, ranked number three in The Assassins Guild, is known as the "Stray Cat". A stoic and deadly woman, she is forced to deal with the crumbling Guild, and crazy state of affairs, seeking out the cause of all this, "Hundred Eyes". She lives in a Japanese home with her grandmother, and her weapon is a pistol.

Former number one, now crippled and retired to an honorary ranking of number zero "The Champ" Goro Hanada is an acquaintance of Stray Cat's, offering news and unsolicited advice. Stray Cat regards The Champ as a pitiful shadow of a man, and teases him about his failures. For the most part the other members of the guild also treat him as such. The Champ himself remains deluded about his usefulness, and ignores others opinions.

Stray Cat receives her assignments from the assassins guild from an enigmatic woman in a white dress named Sayoko Uekyo. As the movie opens they are in the midst of a conversation where Uekyo asks her if she has a man, suggesting some lesbian undertones. The relationship between Stray Cat and Uekyo is open to interpretation, at times the two are friendly, and other times they share mutual disregard.

Uekyo gives Stray Cat the news that the number one ranked killer, the mysterious "Hundred Eyes" is now a target, and Stray Cat is offered the job.

Through the course of film Stray Cat finds herself entangled with many characters, particularly a young girl named Sayoko who wishes to become an assassin herself.

Rival assassins
The Teacher - A wheelchair-using, tracksuit-wearing killer who failed at assassinating a well known-target, due to Stray Cat's involvement.

Painless Surgeon rank #5 - A bearded possibly middle-aged foreigner with a liking for Japanese women and Japanese theatre, who feels no pain. In the style of a true surgeon, he favors knives and blades over firearms. Painless Surgeon claims to be in league with Hundred Eyes, but that is never cleared up.

Dark Horse - A man in a blond wig and black cloak, who claims to be Hundred Eyes. As an assassin, he favors killing people by shooting them in the back of the medulla oblongata, therefore affecting the dying victim's brain nerves, causing them to be dead with the facial expression of a smile. He uses a firearm, with laser scope.

Hundred Eyes rank #1 - A mysterious assassin, no one really knows who he or she is until the climax of the film.

Cast
 Makiko Esumi as Miyuki Minazuki, a.k.a. Stray Cat, a.k.a. Killer No. 3
 Sayoko Yamaguchi as Sayoko Uekyo
 Kirin Kiki as Minazuki's grandmother
 Mikijiro Hira as Goro Hanada, a.k.a. The Champ, a.k.a. the former Killer No. 1
 Hanae Kan as Sayoko, the young girl
 Kenji Sawada as Assassin NO.2
 Jan Woudstra as Painless Surgeon, a.k.a. No. 5
 Masatoshi Nagase as the Man in Black, a.k.a. Dark Horse
 Haruko Kato as Shizuka Orikuchi

Production
Hanada is not played by Joe Shishido this time, but by Mikijiro Hira; Suzuki has said that the original intent was for Shishido to play the character again, but that the film's producer, Satoru Ogura, wanted Hira to play the character instead. The reasons for this are still unclear.

References

External links
 
 
 
 Pistol Opera  at the Japanese Movie Database

2001 films
2000s avant-garde and experimental films
2000s crime thriller films
Films about contract killing
Films directed by Seijun Suzuki
Girls with guns films
Japanese avant-garde and experimental films
2000s Japanese-language films
Japanese sequel films
Shochiku films
2000s Japanese films